is a Japanese stage, film, and television actress. She is from Nagoya, and graduated from high school there. She then joined the Dreamy 7 agency, and then M.M.P, to which she belongs.

Her film appearances include Sotsugyō ryokō (1970), Japan Sinks (1973), Cape Erimo and Zesshō (1975), Ganpeki no Haha (1976), Ōjō Anraku-koku (1978), Tokugawa no Jotei: Ōoku (1988), Baburu to neta onna-tachi (1998), Quartet and Sennen no koi - Hikaru Genji monogatari (2001), Aruku Chikara (2004), and Koharu Komachi (2005). On television, Taeko is a frequent guest star in jidaigeki roles, including Zenigata Heiji, Gokenin Zankurō, Kakushi Metsuki Sanjō and the Hissatsu series. She often appeared on Abarenbō Shōgun (for example, Series 2 #13; 3 #12, 128). In contemporary roles, her appearances include Niji-iro Teikibin on the NHK Educational network (on which she was a semi-regular), Ten made Todoke (as a regular), and Hagure Keiji Junjōha.

Taeko has also made commercials. Among her clients are American Home Assurance Company and Kao.

Sources

This article includes material from 服部妙子 (Hattori Taeko) in the Japanese Wikipedia, retrieved on February 19, 2008.

服部妙子 at JMDB
服部妙子 at M.M.P agency official page
Abarenbō Shōgun II guest list
Abarenbō Shōgun III guest list

1949 births
Living people
Japanese actresses
People from Nagoya